Flight Lieutenant Maxwell Nicholas Sparks AFC (30 December 1920 – 13 June 2013) was a former officer and pilot in the Royal New Zealand Air Force and Royal Air Force.

RAF/RNZAF career
Flight Lieutenant M.N. Sparks AFC gained his pilots wings with the Royal New Zealand Air Force in December 1941. Posted to the United Kingdom he joined the newly formed 487 (N.Z.) Squadron (RAF) in September 1942.

He piloted DeHavilland Mosquito DH.98 reg. HX982 (EG-T) from RAF Hunsdon, Hertfordshire with his navigator Pilot Officer Arthur Cecil Dunlop during the Operation Jericho raid on Amiens prison on 18 February 1944. The aircraft was damaged by flak and suffered a collapsed undercarriage on landing. The crew were uninjured.

Flt Lt Sparks received the Air Force Cross on 31 December 1960.

Personal life
In 2011, Maxwell Sparks was interviewed by the BBC's Martin Shaw at The Swan Inn at Swinbrook in Oxfordshire. He was asked about his role in the 'daring raid' on Amiens prison in 1944 (Operation Jericho). The interview is available to watch on the BBC website.

Flt Lt Sparks spent the final years of his life at his home in Carterton near RAF Brize Norton with his wife Pauline. They had a daughter, Nicola, who died some time before Maxwell's death in June 2013. It is understood his wife Pauline is still alive (in care) as of 2015, though suffering with alzheimer's disease/dementia.

As a tribute to Maxwell's career in the RAF and his contribution to the Allies' win in World War II, the current occupants of his former home in Carterton are currently constructing a flying 1/8th scale replica of DeHavilland Mosquito DH.98 – FB.VI reg. HX982 (EG-T) – the airframe he piloted during the raid on Amiens prison (Operation Jericho). The model will bear the names 'P/O Sparks' and 'P/O Dunlop' on the fuselage. The model will be powered by two 4-stroke internal combustion engines. The scale replica will be built as close to how HX982 would have been on the morning of February 18, 1944 as Max Sparks took off from Hunsdon airfield for the raid on Amiens prison, however the model will incorporate 21st-century electronics to stabilise the craft and mitigate the risk of engine or other mechanical failures.

The aeromodeller constructing the tribute to Max hopes that it will be airworthy some time in 2017.

References

1920 births
2013 deaths
New Zealand recipients of the Air Force Cross (United Kingdom)
New Zealand World War II pilots